Founded in 1964, the American Water Resources Association (AWRA) is a multidisciplinary not-for-profit professional association dedicated to the advancement of individuals in water resources management, research, and education. With more than 2,000 members, AWRA is the pre-eminent multidisciplinary U.S. organization in the field. AWRA’s membership includes engineers, educators, foresters, biologists, ecologists, geographers, managers, regulators, hydrologists, hydro-geologists, attorneys, economists, and water policy specialists. AWRA organizes conferences, publishes the peer-reviewed Journal of the American Water Resources Association (J AWRA), the Water Resources IMPACT magazine, and sponsors various member committees, State Sections and Student Chapters.

AWRA has a seat on the board of directors of the Renewable Natural Resources Foundation (RNRF), is a Member of the World Water Council, and participates in the WWC triennial World Water Forum.

Conferences
AWRA typically sponsors two-to-three conferences a year: a Spring Specialty Conference, a Summer Specialty Conference, and an Annual Water Resources Conference (held in November).  The three-day Specialty Conferences focus on areas such as Geological Information Systems, Riparian Ecosystems, Adaptive Management, Emerging Contaminants in the Environment, Wetlands Restoration, Watershed Management, Agricultural Hydrology, Coastal Water Resources, and Climate Change.  The four-day Annual Conferences offer a comprehensive program of technical and policy oral and poster presentations, plenary sessions, field trips and workshops. The AWRA also occasionally holds Water Policy Dialogues focusing on water policy and management at the local, state and federal levels.  Additionally, the AWRA periodically co-hosts international conferences with other international water resources organizations.

Publications
Each conference produces a proceedings (now available electronically, though earlier proceedings were in print): the Specialty Conference proceedings may include papers and abstracts, while the Annual Conference proceedings include abstracts only.

The Journal of the American Water Resources Association (JAWRA). JAWRA publishes original papers on broad topics related to water resource issues. All papers are refereed prior to publication. JAWRA is published bi-monthly, beginning with the February issue. Prior to 1997, JAWRA was known as Water Resources Bulletin.

Water Resources IMPACT Magazine, originally started as a newsletter, evolved into a magazine with articles addressing the practical issues of water resources management.  Published bi-monthly, each issue is devoted to a particular topic. Some recent issues include Water Infrastructure Resilience, Geospatial Water Technology, U.S. Western Water Issues, including Colorado River Management.

Webinars 
AWRA hosts monthly webinars as well as selected webinar series on a variety of topics. Webinars are free to AWRA members and available for a registration fee for non-members.

Technical Committees
Open only to members, the committees promote an open exchange of ideas on a variety of current topics of concern: Flowing Waters, Future Risk, Integrated Water Resources Management (IWRM), Policy, and Technology.

Caulfield Medal
Since 1988, AWRA has periodically awarded a Henry P. Caulfield Jr. Medal for Exemplary Contributions to National Water Policy to an individual who has achieved eminence in shaping national water policy. On presentation of the first medal to Caulfield in 1988, AWRA President Raymond Herrmann said: "this medal was established to honor an individual whose record of achievements and contributions in setting, designing, and implementing water resources policies at the national level have been extraordinary."

Maidment Award
In 2010 at its Spring Specialty Conference on GIS & Water Resources, AWRA awarded the AWRA Award for Exemplary Contributions to Water Resources Data and Information Systems to David R. Maidment, and then announced its decision to name this award after him. This award recognizes individuals who have made sustained contributions to water resources data by providing leadership in the provision of particular kinds of data, or by improving synthesis of water data using geographic and other information systems.  It is awarded in conjunction with the AWRA Specialty Conferences on the topic.

Other Awards, & Scholarships 
AWRA annually names recipients of numerous other awards, and also awards several scholarships.

References

External links
American Water Resources Association
Journal of the American Water Resources Association  Accessed 6-16-20.
 Complete list of AWRA Awards and Recipients  Accessed 8-9-2010.
Mission, Vision, and History (pdf).

Professional associations based in the United States
Water supply and sanitation in the United States
Water organizations in the United States
Limnology